Anna Louise Kerrison (born 10 September 1998) is an Irish cricketer who plays for Scorchers and Ireland. In October 2014, at the age of  16, she became the first female cricketer to train at the Darren Lehmann Cricket Academy in Australia.

In May 2019, she was added to Ireland's Women's Twenty20 International (WT20I) squad for their series against the West Indies. She made her WT20I debut for Ireland against the West Indies on 28 May 2019.

References

External links
 
 

1998 births
Living people
Irish women cricketers
Ireland women Twenty20 International cricketers
Scorchers (women's cricket) cricketers
Typhoons (women's cricket) cricketers
Dragons (women's cricket) cricketers